Mount Barker Waldorf School is a private school located in the Adelaide Hills, roughly 40 km East of Adelaide, South Australia. It was founded in 1979. The school runs from kindergarten to year 12, providing places for around 340 students from Kindergarten to Year 12. It follows the education philosophies of Rudolf Steiner.

The school has notably seen a decline in education quality and has wavered in adherence to education philosophies of Rudolf Steiner. The school has increasingly made efforts to become more broadly appealing through modernization and looser adherence to Rudolf Steiner's beliefs. Although these efforts were most likely designed to attract new students, this has broadly been unsuccessful, resulting in: the alienation of its own community, veteran and beloved staff retiring early or leaving for other Waldorf schools, and the driving of existing and potential families to other local Waldorf schools. 

The school has also seen a variety of changes and controversies concerning leadership, going through multiple leadership structures in a relatively short period of time. Initial changes to school leadership were likely an effort to help deal with funding and legal troubles, however, this seems to only have led to increased financial and legal troubles. These increased troubles seem to be significantly more severe issues than the original causes for the changes to leadership. These troubles include: financial scandal, injury suits, wrongful termination suits, and the pushing out of veteran staff. These troubles have resulted in the school having gone through several insurance companies, potentially leading to future legal troubles, as well as a degradation in reputation of the school, the reputation now being such that the local MP has severed any relationship to the school and no longer includes it in her round of school visits.

Events 
The Mount Barker Waldorf School holds many annual events. The main event the school holds is the Spring Fair, a fair presenting the work of the students, hosting family friendly activities, and offering a venue for vendors and small businesses to set up stalls.

The school also holds a variety of seasonal festivals. The winter lantern festival is open for all parents to come and watch the lantern walk held by the primary school. Other events include the autumn harvest festival and the spring equinox festival, both also open to parents.

External links
Mount Barker Waldorf School Homepage

Private schools in South Australia
High schools in South Australia
Waldorf schools in Australia
Educational institutions established in 1979
1979 establishments in Australia